A list of films produced in Spain in 1966 (see 1966 in film).

1966

References

Footnotes

Sources

External links
 Spanish films of 1966 at the Internet Movie Database

1966
Spanish
Films